Darling Ridge is a snow-covered, flat-topped ridge,  high, with precipitous rock sides. It was surveyed by the United States Antarctic Research Program Horlick Mountains Traverse party in December 1958, and named by the Advisory Committee on Antarctic Names for Fredric L. Darling, glaciological assistant with the party.

References 

Ridges of Antarctica
Landforms of Wilkes Land